Weldon is a village in Nixon Township, DeWitt County, Illinois, United States. The population was 369 at the 2020 census.

Geography

Demographics

As of the 2020 census there were 369 people, 171 households, and 106 families residing in the village. The racial makeup of the village was 95.66% White, 0.27% from other races, and 4.07% from two or more races. Hispanic or Latino of any race were 0.27% of the population.

There were 171 households, out of which 38.60% had children under the age of 18 living with them, 43.27% were married couples living together, 15.79% had a female householder with no husband present, and 38.01% were non-families. 35.09% of all households were made up of individuals, and 15.20% had someone living alone who was 65 years of age or older. The average household size was 2.75 and the average family size was 2.19.

The village's age distribution consisted of 19.7% under the age of 18, 4.3% from 18 to 24, 21.6% from 25 to 44, 29.2% from 45 to 64, and 25.3% who were 65 years of age or older. The median age was 49.5 years. For every 100 females, there were 131.5 males. For every 100 females age 18 and over, there were 116.5 males.

The median income for a household in the village was $44,688, and the median income for a family was $58,929. Males had a median income of $36,705 versus $34,250 for females. The per capita income for the village was $26,537. About 8.5% of families and 9.9% of the population were below the poverty line, including 10.8% of those under age 18 and 4.2% of those age 65 or over.

Local high school

De Land-Weldon is a school district that services both towns and the surrounding areas.  It is the smallest public high school in the state with a total enrollment of 50.

References

Villages in DeWitt County, Illinois
Villages in Illinois